Geraldton–Mount Magnet Road is a  major regional road in the Mid West region of Western Australia,  starting in Utakarra in Geraldton's eastern suburbs, and terminating  east-northeast at Great Northern Highway near the mining town of Mount Magnet. The road is signed as State Route 123, is a two-lane single carriageway for its entire length, and is a major traffic route which is regularly used by heavy vehicles and mine/grain road trains.

The construction of Stage Two of the Geraldton Southern Transport Corridor is expected to remove considerable traffic from the Geraldton end of the road.

Description
Geraldton–Mount Magnet Road commences in Utakarra as a continuation of Utakarra Road, which carries State Route 123 from North West Coastal Highway  to the southwest. It heads east towards Geraldton Airport, then east-northeast through the flat-topped Moresby Ranges on its way towards the agricultural town of Mullewa.

Towns 
Towns and settlements on this highway include:

 Deepdale
 Geraldton Airport
 Moonyoonooka
 Kojarena
 Northern Gully
 Wicherina
 Tenindewa
 Mullewa
 Pindar
Wurarga
 Yalgoo

See also

 Highways in Australia
 List of highways in Western Australia

References

Highways in rural Western Australia
Geraldton